The Conference of Ambassadors of the Principal Allied and Associated Powers was an inter-allied organization of the Entente in the period following the end of World War I. Formed in Paris in January 1920 it became a successor of the Supreme War Council and was later on de facto incorporated into the League of Nations as one of its governing bodies. It became less active after the Locarno Treaties of 1925 and formally ceased to exist in 1931 or 1935.

The Conference consisted of ambassadors of Great Britain, Italy, and Japan accredited in Paris and French minister of foreign affairs. The ambassador of the United States attended as an observer because the United States was not an official party to the Treaty of Versailles. French diplomat René Massigli was its secretary-general for its entire existence. It was chaired by the French foreign ministers, among them Georges Clemenceau, Raymond Poincaré and Aristide Briand.

It was formed to enforce peace treaties and to mediate various territorial disputes among European states. Some of the disputed regions handled by the Conference included Cieszyn Silesia (between Poland and Czechoslovakia), the Vilnius Region (between Poland and Lithuania), the Klaipėda Region (between Germany and Lithuania) and the Corfu Incident (between Italy and Greece). One of its major territorial decisions was made on 15 March 1923, in recognizing the eastern borders of Poland created following the Polish–Soviet War of 1920. The Conference also recognized Polish sovereignty over the Vilnius region and Eastern Galicia.

The Conference of Ambassadors of the Principal Allied and Associated Powers was appointed by the League of Nations to take charge of the Greek/Albanian border dispute that turned into the Corfu Incident of 1923.

Jules Laroche and Massigli were the first two secretaries-general. A series of committees and commissions worked as permanent or sometimes ad hoc advisers to the secretaries-general.

See also
 Supreme War Council
 American Commission to Negotiate Peace
 Klaipėda Region and Klaipėda Revolt
 League of Nations mandate

References

Further reading
 Pink, Gerhard Paul. The Conference of ambassadors (Paris 1920-1931) its history, the theoretical aspect of its work, and its place in international organization (Geneva research centre, 1942).

External links
 Text of the resolution regarding the borders of Poland

League of Nations
Organizations established in 1920
Czechoslovakia–Poland relations
Organizations disestablished in 1931
International commissions
International diplomatic organizations
International organizations based in Europe
Former international organizations
Treaty of Versailles
France–Italy relations
France–Japan relations
France–United Kingdom relations
France–United States relations
Italy–Japan relations
Italy–United Kingdom relations
Italy–United States relations
United Kingdom–United States relations